Uppātasanti Pagoda (pronounced ; officially called , also called the "Peace Pagoda") is a prominent landmark in Naypyidaw, the capital of Myanmar. The pagoda houses a Buddha tooth relic.

History
Construction of Uppatasanti Pagoda began on 12 November 2006, with the stake-driving ceremony, and completed in March 2009, built under the guidance of Than Shwe, head of Burma's ruling State Peace and Development Council. The invitation card for the stake-driving ceremony opened with a phrase "Rajahtani Naypyidaw" (the royal capital where the president resides). The pagoda is 30 cm shorter than the Shwedagon Pagoda.

"Uppātasanti" roughly translates to "protection against calamity". It is the name of a sutta prepared by a monk in the early 16th century. It is to be recited in time of crisis, especially in the face of foreign invasion.

Structure
The massive base of the Pagoda which may be mistaken for a large hill is completely man-made.

The pagoda precinct also comprises:
 Maha Hsutaungpyae Buddha Image in Maha Pasadabhumi Gandhakuti Chamber
 Four jade Buddha images in the pagoda's hollow cave
 108 feet high flagstaff
 Bo tree Garden with Maha Bo Tree and the images of the 28 Buddhas
 Garden of 108 Bo Trees
 Marlini Mangala Lake with the chamber of Shin Uppagutta
 Withongama Ordination Hall (thein)
 Cetiyapala Chamber
 Sangha Yama hostels
 Sasana Maha Beikmandaw Building
 Pagoda museum
 Pitakat Building and Religious Archive

According to The Irrawaddy, 20 people died during a ferris wheel accident at a festival marking the pagoda's consecration in March 2009. The consecration of the pagoda, which involves the hoisting of the htidaw (sacred umbrella) and the seinbudaw (diamond lotus bud), took place on 10 March 2009.

Gallery

References

Pagodas in Myanmar
Buildings and structures in Naypyidaw
Religious buildings and structures completed in 2009
Buddhist pilgrimage sites in Myanmar
Buddhist relics